Clark County High School can refer to any of the following high schools in the United States:
Clark County High School (Idaho) in Dubois, Idaho
Clark County High School (Missouri) in Kahoka, Missouri

It is also often used incorrectly in Kentucky to refer to George Rogers Clark High School in Winchester, the only public high school serving Clark County, Kentucky.

See also
Clark High School (disambiguation)
Clarke County High School (disambiguation)